Béla Szombati (born 1955) is a former Hungarian Ambassador to the United States.

Career
He served as head of the Strategic Planning and Information Management Department at the Ministry of Foreign Affairs (2006–09) as well as Hungary's ambassador to the United Kingdom (2002–06) and to France (1994–99). In addition, he was deputy head of the State Secretariat for European Integration (1999-2002) and foreign policy advisor to the Hungarian president and head of the Foreign Relations Department of the President's Office in Budapest (1991–94).

Szombati — who previously served in Washington from 1988 to 1991 as cultural attaché at the Hungarian Embassy — has also held posts at the Hungarian Embassy in Vietnam as well as in the Foreign Ministry's Departments for North America, Asia, Western Europe and International Security.

He was appointed ambassador to the United States in 2009 following Ferenc Somogyi in this position. After the 2010 Hungarian parliamentary election he was replaced by György Szapáry, a Hungarian businessman.

He also worked for the Delegation of the European Union to Turkey in years 2012–2016.

Education
He completed his higher education at London University and Eötvös Loránd University in Budapest, where he graduated in 1980, after which he joined the Ministry of Foreign Affairs.

He speaks fluent English and French as well as some Russian and Spanish.

Private life
Szombati is married to Zsuzsa Mihályi and has two sons, Kristóf (born 1980) and Dániel (born 1986).

External links

The Washington Diplomat Newspaper - Ambassador profile
Embassy of Hungary in the USA: The Ambassador
Embassy of Hungary in the USA: Biography of the Ambassador

1955 births
Living people
Hungarian politicians
Ambassadors of Hungary to the United Kingdom
Ambassadors of Hungary to the United States
Ambassadors of Hungary to France